Rhopalini is a tribe of insects in the subfamily Rhopalinae, family Rhopalidae, order Hemiptera.

Genera
BioLib includes:
 Brachycarenus Fieber, 1860
 Corizus Fallén, 1814
 Limacocarenus Kiritshenko, 1914
 Liorhyssus Stål, 1870
 Maccevethus Dallas, 1852
 Punjentorhopalus Ahmad & Rizvi, 1999
 Rhopalus Schilling, 1827
 Stictopleurus Stål, 1872

References

External links 
Biolib: Rhopalini Amyot & Serville, 1843

 
Rhopalinae
Hemiptera tribes